Lebasiella is a genus of checkered beetles in the family Cleridae. There are about five described species in Lebasiella.

Species
These five species belong to the genus Lebasiella:
 Lebasiella discolor (Klug, 1842)
 Lebasiella marginella (Chevrolat, 1843)
 Lebasiella mesosternalis Schaeffer, 1908
 Lebasiella pallipes (Klug, 1842)
 Lebasiella unimaculata Pic, 1940

References

Further reading

 

Cleridae
Articles created by Qbugbot